United Nations Security Council resolution 480, adopted unanimously on 12 November 1980, after noting the deaths of International Court of Justice (ICJ) judges Richard R. Baxter and Salah El Dine Tarazi, the Council decided that elections to the two vacancies on the ICJ would take place on 15 January 1981 at the Security Council and General Assembly.

See also
 List of United Nations Security Council Resolutions 401 to 500 (1976–1982)

References
Text of the Resolution at undocs.org

External links
 

 0480
 0480
November 1980 events